The Place and the Time is a compilation album of demos, outtakes, alternative versions and live versions of songs by Moby Grape, released by Sundazed Records in 2009 in CD and double LP format.

History 

The album was released in April 2009, almost ten years to the day after the death of founding band member Skip Spence. Many of the songs were previously released as bonus tracks to CD releases of Moby Grape albums by Sundazed Records.  The compilation was produced by David Rubinson, who was also the band's original producer.  The title is from a song written by Jerry Miller and Don Stevenson on the Wow/Grape Jam album set, originally released in 1968.

Reception 

As described by one reviewer, "If you’re not convinced Moby Grape (was) one of the hippest, baddest, realest, and rawest bands of the late 1960s, then grab this new outtakes and live cuts compilation from Sundazed and try to explain otherwise."  As described by David Fricke of Rolling Stone, "these rarities - among them rowdy audition tracks and Moby Grape outtakes - are a dynamic alternate portrait of the star-crossed San Francisco band at work, fusing pop, soul, blues and country with psychedelic zeal." As described in Mojo, "...the imperfections accentuate Grape's never-played-safe, gutsy rock'n'roll. There are moments when it sounds like the music is going to explode into chaos, but these professionals could take it to the edge and pull it back at the abyss. Jerry Miller is a guitar god, Peter Lewis a folk-rock master, Bob Mosley a muscular bassist and blue-eyed soulman extraodinaire, Don Stevenson a driver of a drummer and more, and Skip Spence is a one of rock's most original madmen. Why they don't make 'em like Moby Grape any more is arguable- but they don't."

Mark Deming of Allmusic wrote:
(...) these outtakes, demos, live recordings, and stray items cohere  into a fine portrait of what made Moby Grape one of the great (if underappreciated ) bands of their era.  (...) the live tapes capture Moby Grape in full flight before the dream began to collapse, and offer a tantalizing picture of how powerful they must have been on a good night. (...) this music demonstrates why Moby Grape still matters to so many all these years later.

Track listing

Disc 1

"Indifference" Columbia Records audition recording (1967)
"Looper" Columbia Records audition recording (1967)
"Stop" Demo recording (1967)
"Rounder" Instrumental outtake recording from the Moby Grape sessions (1967)
"Sweet Ride (Never Again)" Unedited version, recorded for the motion picture The Sweet Ride (1967)
"Loosely Remembered" Demo recording (1967)
"The Place and the Time" Alternate version from the Wow album sessions (1967)
"Bitter Wind" Demo recording (1967)
"Seeing" Alternate version from the Wow album sessions (1968)
"What's to Choose" Alternate version from the Wow album sessions (1968)
"Miller's Blues"* Alternate version from the Wow album sessions (1968)
"Soul Stew" Outtake recording from the Moby Grape '69 album sessions (1968)
"If You Can't Learn From My Mistakes" Demo recording (1968)

Disc 2

"You Can Do Anything" Demo recording (1967)
"Skip's Song" Demo recording (1967)
"It's a Beautiful Day Today" Demo recording (1968)
"What's to Choose" Demo recording (1967)
"Hoochie" Demo recording (1968)
"Big" Demo recording (1968)
"Rounder" Live recording (1968)
"Miller's Blues" Live recording (1968)
"Changes" Live recording (1968)
"Looper" Demo recording (1967)
"Soul Stew" Instrumental outtake recording from the Moby Grape '69 album sessions (1968)
"Cockatoo Blues (Tongue-Tied)" Demo recording (1968)
Bonus track available only on double LP

Personnel 
 Peter Lewis – rhythm guitar, vocals
 Bob Mosley – bass, vocals
 Jerry Miller – lead guitar, vocals
 Skip Spence – rhythm guitar, vocals
 Don Stevenson – drums, vocals

References 

2009 compilation albums
Moby Grape albums
Albums produced by Dave Rubinson